William Underwood may refer to:

People 
A. W. Underwood (1855–?), American man purported to have pyrokinetic abilities
William Lyman Underwood (1864–1929), American photographer
William D. Underwood, American university president
William Underwood (cricketer) (1852–1914), English cricketer

Other uses 
William Underwood Company, American food company

Underwood, William